Abyarachryson signaticolle is a species of beetle in the family Cerambycidae, the only species in the genus Abyarachryson.

References

Achrysonini
Monotypic Cerambycidae genera
Beetles described in 1851